The Best Plan Is No Plan is a 2013 Hong Kong romantic comedy drama film directed by Patrick Kong. It was released on 17 October.

Cast
Sammy Sum
Hanjin Tan
Justin Cheung
Shiga Lin
Angel Chiang
Jinny Ng
Elva Ni
Jacquelin Chong
Terence Siufay
Yao Meng
Hoi-Pang Lo
Siu Yam-yam
Bob Lam
Linah Matsuoka
Rainky Wai

Reception

Box office
By 21 November 2014, the film had earned ¥0.66 million at the Chinese box office.

References

External links

2013 romantic comedy-drama films
2013 films
Films directed by Patrick Kong
Hong Kong romantic comedy-drama films
2013 comedy films
2013 drama films
2010s Hong Kong films